Alireza Sadeghi (born 14 March 1999) is an Iranian footballer who played as a forward for Sepahan in the Persian Gulf Pro League.

Career
Sadeghi made his Iran Pro League debut on 6 March 2021 against Aluminium Arak.

He became the top-scorer of Iran U-19 and U-21 Iran Football Leagues for three seasons from 2017 to 2020.

Career statistics

References

Living people
1999 births
Iranian footballers
Association football forwards
Sepahan S.C. footballers